Fernando Moresi Vergara (June 27, 1970 – October 29, 2016) was a former field hockey player from Argentina. He competed for his native country at the 1996 Summer Olympics, where he finished in ninth place with  the national squad. He twice won a medal at the Pan American Games.

References

External links
 

1970 births
2016 deaths
Argentine male field hockey players
Field hockey players at the 1996 Summer Olympics
Olympic field hockey players of Argentina
Pan American Games gold medalists for Argentina
Pan American Games silver medalists for Argentina
Pan American Games medalists in field hockey
Field hockey players at the 1995 Pan American Games
Field hockey players at the 1999 Pan American Games
Medalists at the 1995 Pan American Games
20th-century Argentine people
21st-century Argentine people